Fast endophilin-mediated endocytosis (FEME) is an endocytic pathway found in eukaryotic cells. It requires the activity of endophilins as well as dynamins, but does not require clathrin.

In Clathrin-dependent endocytic pathways, endosomes budding from the cell membrane into the cell will form in clathrin pits, and be coated by clathrin triskelions. In FEME however, endosomes form when coated by actin, and internalise endophilin A2.

Function 
Each endocytic pathway focuses on a particular component, and FEME is primarily involved in transporting receptors. These include receptors for acetylcholine and IL-2.

Associated proteins 
 EGFR
 HGFR
 VEGFR
 PDGFR
 NGFR
 IGF1R
 SHIP1
 SHIP2

References 

Molecular biology
Cellular processes